is a Japanese professional sumo wrestler from Chiba Prefecture. He made his debut in November 2015 and reached the top makuuchi division in March 2020. He wrestles for Sadogatake stable. His highest rank has been komusubi. He is the son of former sekiwake Kotonowaka Terumasa (who is also his stablemaster) and grandson of 53rd yokozuna Kotozakura Masakatsu.

Early life
Kamatani was born on November 19, 1997, the only child of then top division sumo wrestler Kotonowaka Terumasa. Kotonowaka had married the daughter of his stablemaster, former yokozuna Kotozakura. In November 2005 when Kamatani was in the second year of elementary school his father retired and took over the running of Sadogatake stable. Kamatani was in the Fukuoka International Center to witness his father's final bout, and his father told him to one day inherit the Kotonowaka name. He was in his third year of Saitama Sakae High School (well-known for its sumo club) and had won the gold medal in the heavyweight division at the World Junior Sumo Championships when he decided to enter professional sumo at the age of 17.

Career
Kamatani made his professional sumo debut in November 2015 under the shikona . He won all three of his maezumo bouts and in the following tournament in January 2016 won the jonokuchi championship with a perfect 7–0 record. He made the makushita division in September 2016, and in May 2019 a 4–3 record at makushita 2 was enough to earn promotion to the sekitori ranks for the first time. He adopted his father's shikona surname of Kotonowaka upon the promotion, with the expectation that he would eventually adopt his grandfather's shikona of Kotozakura if ever promoted to ōzeki.

With four straight kachi-koshi or winning records in the jūryō division, Kotonowaka was promoted to the top makuuchi division in March 2020. They were the ninth father-and-son pairing to both reach the top division. Kotonowaka was ranked at maegashira 18, the first time since 1959 that maegashira had extended to an 18th rank. He secured a winning record on the 14th day of the tournament, having suffered four straight losses, and finished on 9–6. The next tournament to take place in July 2020 saw him pull out with a knee injury on Day 8, which he sustained the previous day in a loss to Kaisei. He re-entered on Day 14 but was unable to add any more wins, finishing on 4–6–5 which saw him demoted back to jūryō. He earned immediate promotion back to makuuchi for the November 2020 tournament with a 9–6 record (although he lost his last four matches).

Upon his return to makuuchi Kotonowaka only managed a 7–8 record (this time losing his last three matches) although it was enough to keep him in the top division as he fell just one place from maegashira 14 to 15. He performed better in the January 2021 tournament, scoring 10–5. He narrowly failed to get a majority of wins in the March and May 2021 tournaments, scoring 6–9 and 7–8 respectively.

In the July 2021 tournament Kotonowaka had his best career performance to date. He scored 12–3 and was awarded his first special prize, for Fighting Spirit. He moved up to maegashira 3 for the September tournament. On the eighth day of the September tournament he defeated ōzeki Shōdai. However, he had to withdraw from the tournament with a left knee injury on Day 10.

In January 2022 Kotonowaka won eleven matches from  14, and was awarded the Fighting Spirit prize for the second time. In March Kotonowaka was in contention for the championship on the final day for the second straight tournament, but lost to Hōshōryū when victory would have given him a chance of a playoff with the other two contenders, Wakatakakage and Takayasu. He finished in third place with 11–4, but did receive his third Fighting Spirit prize. In the May 2022 tournament he reached   2.

After a 9-6 winning record at his highest rank of maegashira 1, Kotonowaka was promoted to komusubi for the January 2023 tournament. At the January tournament he secured an 8–7 record on the final day with a win over Hokutofuji. Kotonowaka lost his first four bouts of the tournament, but rallied to get a winning record which included a win over eventual championship winner ozeki Takakeishō. He retained his komusubi rankings for the March tournament.

Fighting style
Kotonowaka prefers a migi-yotsu grip on his opponent's mawashi which is an left hand outside, right hand inside position. He also lists oshi (pushing) asa a favourite style in his Japan Sumo Association profile. Apart from yori-kiri and oshi-dashi (force out and push out), his most common winning kimarite include uwatenage (overarm throw), tsukiotoshi (thrust over) and uwatedashinage (pulling overam throw).

Career record

See also
List of active sumo wrestlers
Glossary of sumo terms
List of komusubi

References

External links

 

1997 births
Living people
Japanese sumo wrestlers
Sumo people from Chiba Prefecture
Sadogatake stable sumo wrestlers
Komusubi